Djakotomey  is a town and commune in the Kouffo Department of south-western Benin. The commune covers an area of 325 square kilometers and as of 2013 had a population of 134,704 people.

References
 

Communes of Benin
Arrondissements of Benin
Populated places in the Kouffo Department